Jorge Luis Garcés Rojas (born 13 May 1954) is a Chilean football manager and former player who played as a midfielder.

Manager
Garcés was born in Talca. He started his managerial career in 1989 with RFC Arquennes. In 1992, he won the Primera B Championship with Provincial Osorno.

Garcés joined Santiago Wanderers in 1999, getting promotion to First Division.  In 2001, the team won the First Division championship, qualifying to the Copa Libertadores.

Following the resignation of Pedro García, manager of Chile national football team in 2001, Garcés was hired by the ANFP to coach the Chilean team, getting two defeats (Brazil 2–0 Chile, Colombia 3–1 Chile) and a draw (Chile 0–0 Ecuador).

O'Higgins hired Garcés for the 2007 Clausura, finishing second in the League Table. The club also reached the semi-finals. Garcés left the team in 2007.

Honours
Provincial Osorno
 Primera B: 1992

Santiago Wanderers
 Primera División de Chile: 2001

References

External links
 

Living people
1954 births
People from Talca
Association football midfielders
Chilean footballers
Santiago Wanderers footballers
San Luis de Quillota footballers
Deportes Iberia footballers
Real C.D. España players
Lota Schwager footballers
Francs Borains players
Rayo Vallecano players
Club Deportivo Universidad Católica footballers
Deportes La Serena footballers
Chilean Primera División players
Primera B de Chile players
Liga Nacional de Fútbol Profesional de Honduras players
Challenger Pro League players
Segunda División players
Chilean expatriate footballers
Expatriate footballers in Honduras
Chilean expatriate sportspeople in Honduras
Expatriate footballers in Belgium
Chilean expatriate sportspeople in Belgium
Expatriate footballers in Spain
Chilean expatriate sportspeople in Spain
Chilean football managers
Provincial Osorno managers
Everton de Viña del Mar managers
Cobreloa managers
Deportes Temuco managers
Deportes Puerto Montt managers
Deportes Iquique managers
Santiago Wanderers managers
Chile national football team managers
Chiapas F.C. managers
O'Higgins F.C. managers
Deportes Concepción (Chile) managers
Unión Española managers
Ñublense managers
Rangers de Talca managers
Chilean Primera División managers
Primera B de Chile managers
Liga MX managers
Chilean expatriate football managers
Expatriate football managers in Mexico
Chilean expatriate sportspeople in Mexico
Expatriate football managers in Belgium